"Something Here in My Heart (Keeps A Tellin' Me No)" was a top 20 hit in the UK Singles Chart for the Paper Dolls in 1968.

Background
The song was composed by MacLeod and Tony Macaulay, the songwriting duo who also wrote songs for Pickettywitch, The Flying Machine, Long John Baldry and The Foundations.

It was first released on PYE 7N 17456 on February 23, 1968.

Chart history
The record peaked at number 11 in the UK Singles Chart, spending 13 weeks on the listing.

References

1968 songs
Pye Records singles
1968 debut singles
Songs written by John Macleod (songwriter)
Songs written by Tony Macaulay